Pictothyris is a genus of brachiopods belonging to the family Frenulinidae.

The species of this genus are found in Japan.

Species:

Pictothyris elegans 
Pictothyris laquaeformis 
Pictothyris picta 
Pictothyris tanegashimaensis

References

Brachiopod genera